Jonathan Abbatt is a Canadian chemist currently at the University of Toronto and an Elected Fellow of the American Geophysical Union. His work mainly focuses on chemical processes in the atmosphere.

Research and career

Awards and honors 
Abbatt's honors and awards include:

 2020 Chemical Institute of Canada Award

References

Year of birth missing (living people)
Living people
Fellows of the American Geophysical Union
21st-century Canadian chemists